Mauro Bertoni (born 27 October 1969) is an Italian football manager.

References

Italian football managers
Italian footballers
Living people
1969 births
Association football defenders